Andrey Latypaw (born 16 May 1990) is a retired Belarusian professional footballer.

External links
Profile at teams.by

1990 births
Living people
Belarusian footballers
Association football forwards
FC Neman Grodno players
FC Belcard Grodno players
FC Dnepr Mogilev players